Goat's foot is a common name for several plants and may refer to:

Ipomoea pes-caprae
Oxalis pes-caprae

A goat's foot may also refer to a type of reloading mechanism for a crossbow.